Tajio (Ajio), or Kasimbar, is a Celebic language of Sulawesi in Indonesia.

The Tajio-speaking area is located between Lauje and Ampibabo.

References

 

Tomini–Tolitoli languages
Languages of Sulawesi